Akihito vanuatu, the Vanuatu's emperor, is a species of fish in the family Oxudercidae, the gobies. It is endemic to Vanuatu, where it inhabits streams and pools.  Males of this species can reach a length of  SL while females can reach  SL.

This species was described to science in 2007. A new genus was erected for it, the name honoring Emperor Akihito, an ichthyologist and expert on gobies.

References

External links
 Photograph. FishBase.

Gobiidae
Endemic fauna of Vanuatu
Taxa named by Ronald E. Watson
Taxa named by Philippe Keith
Taxa named by Gérard Marquet
Fish described in 2007
Japan–Vanuatu relations